Lavdani is a village and a former community in the Ioannina regional unit, Epirus, Greece. Since the 2011 local government reform it is part of the municipality Pogoni, of which it is a municipal unit. The municipal unit has an area of 48.191 km2, the community 31.866 km2. Population 118 (2011).

Notable people 
Spyridon Simos, journalist and politician

References

Populated places in Ioannina (regional unit)